Donn Sorensen (born April 11, 1961) is a healthcare executive, philanthropist, public speaker and author. He is currently the Executive Vice President of Operations for Mercy Health. He oversees operations in all four states that Mercy services. Sorensen is the Chairman of Board and a member of the American Medical Group Association’s board of directors. He is also a fellow of the American College of Medical Practice Executives.

Mercy Health
 Sorensen is currently the Executive Vice President of Operations for Mercy Health. He oversees operations in all four states that Mercy services. (cite STL Today article). From March 2012 - April 2017, Sorensen was the Regional President of Mercy’s East Region. He was Vice President/COO of Mercy Clinic from 2010-2012. He was previously executive vice president with responsibility over Mercy’s Health in Springfield and surrounding communities. He also served as Senior Vice President/COO for St. John’s Mercy Clinic.

Author
Sorensen is the author of Integrated Delivery Systems: A Cure for the Healthcare Delivery Crisis. The book provides guidance on how to lay the groundwork for a successful accountable care organization. Donn's latest book, Big Hearted Leadership: Five Keys to Create Success Through Compassion, is about "Honesty. Vulnerability. Humor. These are just a few of the values that make a leader. But above all of these is compassion. Putting your compassion for people first is key to being someone worthy of following."

Public Speaking 
Sorensen speaks at many events including conferences, healthcare conventions, and graduations.

Philanthropy
Sorensen serves as the board chair of The Make-A-Wish Missouri Foundation.

Prior Healthcare Work
Sorensen worked 25 years in health care including work with Premier Practice Management (a national practice operations organization), several specialty and multispecialty groups in Nashville, Tennessee, and Baton Rouge, Louisiana, and with the Mayo Clinic in Rochester, Minnesota.

Education
Sorensen holds a master's degree in business administration from Southwest Missouri State University and Luther College in Decorah, Iowa.

References

External links
About Donn Sorensen

American chief operating officers
Luther College (Iowa) alumni
Missouri State University alumni
1961 births
Living people